Sean Garrity is a Canadian film director and screenwriter. He is best known for his 2001 film Inertia, which won the award for Best Canadian First Feature Film at the 2001 Toronto International Film Festival, and his 2012 film My Awkward Sexual Adventure.

Filmography
Inertia (2001)
Lucid (2005)
Zooey & Adam (2009)
Teeth (short film) (2011)
My Awkward Sexual Adventure (2012)
Blood Pressure (2012)
After the Ball (2015)
Borealis (2015)
I Propose We Never See Each Other Again After Tonight (2020)
The End of Sex (2022)
The Burning Season (TBA)

References

External links

21st-century Canadian screenwriters
21st-century Canadian male writers
Canadian male screenwriters
Film directors from Winnipeg
Writers from Winnipeg
Living people
Year of birth missing (living people)
Canadian Comedy Award winners